The 2012 United States presidential election in Colorado took place on November 6, 2012, as part of the 2012 United States presidential election in which all 50 states plus the District of Columbia participated. Colorado voters chose nine electors to represent them in the Electoral College via a popular vote pitting incumbent Democratic President Barack Obama and his running mate, Vice President Joe Biden, against Republican challenger and former Massachusetts Governor Mitt Romney and his running mate, Congressman Paul Ryan. Obama and Biden carried Colorado with 51.49%  of the popular vote to Romney's and Ryan's 46.13%, thus winning the state's nine electoral votes by a 5.36% margin.

As in 2008, the key to Obama's victory was Democratic dominance in the Denver area, sweeping not just the city but also the heavily populated suburban counties around Denver, particularly Adams, Arapahoe, and Jefferson counties; as well as winning Larimer County, home to Fort Collins. Obama also took nearly 70% of the vote in Boulder County, home to Boulder; and won Chaffee County, which he had lost to McCain in 2008. Romney's most populated county wins were in El Paso County, where Colorado Springs is located; and Weld County, a suburb of Denver and home to Greeley.

This election solidified Colorado's transformation from a historically Republican-leaning state into a Democratic-leaning swing state. Obama's 2012 victory in the state, on the heels of his 2008 victory, marked the first time that the Democrats had carried Colorado in two consecutive elections since the landslide re-election of Franklin D. Roosevelt in 1936, the first time that the state had voted Democratic in a close election since 1948, and the first time since 1964 that a sitting Democratic president carried Colorado.

Colorado served as the tipping-point state for Obama's overall victory in the presidential election; that is, the first state to give a candidate their 270th electoral vote when all states are arranged by their margins of victory. Colorado was also the tipping-point state for Obama's 2008 victory. This marks the second time in history that a president was elected and re-elected by winning the same tipping-point state, after Richard Nixon was carried to victory by Ohio twice in 1968 and 1972.

As of 2020, this remains the most recent occasion in which rural Conejos County, Huerfano County, and Las Animas County have voted for the Democratic candidate. This is also the last time that Colorado voted to the right of Michigan, Minnesota, Wisconsin, Nevada, Iowa, New Hampshire, and Pennsylvania (by 0.02%), that Colorado was the tipping point state in a presidential election, and that the tipping point state voted to the left of the popular vote.

Caucuses

Democratic
Incumbent President Barack Obama ran unopposed in the Colorado Democratic caucus.

Republican

The Republican caucuses were held on "Republican Party Precinct Caucus Day" (February 7, 2012). Caucus locations opened on 9 PM, February 7, 2012, with 36 delegates at stake; 33 of which are tied to the caucuses while 3 are unpledged RNC delegates. The event occurred alongside the Minnesota Republican caucuses as well the Missouri Republican primary. The race was widely expected to be won by Mitt Romney even on the day of the caucus, but a strong surge by Rick Santorum across all three races that day carried him to a close victory.

Conventions
There is no formal system of allocating delegates to candidates in any step of the election process. At each meeting the participants decides what the best course of action is.None of the 36 delegates are legally bound to vote for a candidate.
 12–13 April: Seven congressional conventions elects 3 National Convention delegates each and also elects delegates for the state convention.
 14 April: State convention elects 12 National Convention delegates.

General election

Ballot access

 Virgil Goode/Jim Clymer, Constitution
 Barack Obama/Joseph Biden, Democratic
 Mitt Romney/Paul Ryan, Republican
 Gary Johnson/James P. Gray, Libertarian
 Jill Stein/Cheri Honkala, Green
 Stewart Alexander/Alex Mendoza, Socialist
 Rocky Anderson/Luis J. Rodriguez, Justice
 Roseanne Barr/Cindy Shehan, Peace and Freedom 
 James Harris/Alyson Kennedy, Socialist Workers
 Tom Hoefling/J.D. Ellis, America's
 Gloria La Riva/Filberto Ramirez Jr., Socialism and Liberation
 Merlin Miller/Harry V. Bertram, American Third Position
 Jill Reed/Tom Cary, Twelve Visions Party
 Thomas Robert Stevens/Alden Link, Objectivist
 Shella "Samm" Tittle/Matthew A. Turner, We the People
 Jerry White/Phyllis Scherrer, Socialist Equality

Polling

Incumbent Barack Obama started off with a wide lead in polls ranging from 1 to 13 points, which continued throughout the early summer of 2012. On August 6, Romney won his first poll, 50% to 45%. Throughout the rest of the summer, and September, with the exception of a few points, Obama won almost every poll but narrowly. In October, Romney gained momentum and the race throughout October was essentially tied, with neither candidate taking a significant lead. The last week before the election, Obama gained momentum and won each of the 4 pre-election polls. The average of the last 3 pre-election polls showed Obama leading Romney 49.7% to 46.3%. The final pre-election poll showed Obama leading Romney 52% to 46%, which was accurate compared to the results. Washington Post rated this race "Toss-Up."

Results

By county

Counties that flipped from Republican to Democratic 

 Chaffee (largest city: Salida)

By congressional district
Obama won 4 of 7 congressional districts including one held by a Republican.

See also
 2012 Republican Party presidential primaries
 2012 Republican Party presidential debates and forums
 Results of the 2012 Republican Party presidential primaries
 Colorado Republican Party

References

External links
  of the Colorado Republican Party
The Green Papers: for Colorado
The Green Papers: Major state elections in chronological order

Colorado
United States President
2012